This article shows all participating team squads at the 2008 Men's European Water Polo Championship.

Source

Source

Source

Source

Source

Source

Source

Source

Source

Source

Source

Source

References

Men
European Water Polo Championship squads
Men's European Water Polo Championship